Christmas Variations is a studio album by Rick Wakeman.

Track listing
"Silent Night"  – 4:35
"Hark The Herald Angels Sing"  – 6:19
"Christians Awake, Salute The Happy Morn"  – 7:02
"Away In A Manger"  – 5:28
"While Shepherds Watch Their Flocks By Night"  – 5:33
"O Little Town of Bethlehem"  – 6:06
"Once In Royal David's City"  – 4:58
"O Come All Ye Faithful"  – 5:16
"Angels From The Realms of Glory"  – 4:27

References

Rick Wakeman albums
2000 Christmas albums
Christmas albums by English artists